Ozyptila pacifica is a species of crab spider in the family Thomisidae. It is found in the United States and Canada.

References

pacifica
Articles created by Qbugbot
Spiders described in 1895